Roach v Electoral Commissioner is a High Court of Australia case, decided in 2007, dealing with the validity of Commonwealth legislation that prevented prisoners from voting. The Court held that the 2006 amendments were inconsistent with the system of representative democracy established by the Constitution. Voting in elections lies at the heart of that system of representative government, and disenfranchisement of a group of adult citizens without a substantial reason would not be consistent with it. The three-year criterion in the 2004 amendments was held to be valid as it sufficiently distinguished between serious lawlessness and less serious but still reprehensible conduct.

Background 

Vicki Lee Roach was a Victorian woman of Aboriginal descent, who was serving a six-year term of imprisonment at the Dame Phyllis Frost Centre in Deer Park. In 2002, Roach and her then partner robbed a milk bar. She was driving the getaway car, being pursued by police, when she struck a car stopped at a traffic light, causing extensive injuries to the 21-year-old driver. Roach had alcohol, tranquilisers, morphine, and a cannabis-related substance in her blood and was subsequently convicted on five counts for offences of burglary, theft, conduct endangering persons, and negligently causing serious injury. On each count, she received a sentence of between 12 months and 3 years, with a total effective sentence of six years and a non-parole period of 4 years.

Roach was represented by Ron Merkel , a former judge of the Federal Court of Australia, and assisted by the Human Rights Law Centre. The arguments included that indigenous Australians were disproportionately disqualified from voting, as indigenous Australians are only 2.5% of the population, but constitute more than a quarter of the national prison population.

Decision 

Chief Justice Murray Gleeson held that the right to vote was constitutionally protected. Universal suffrage was long established; anything less was not a choice by the people as required by sections 7 and 24 of the Constitution.

Removing the right to vote for serious misconduct was acceptable (hence the previous legislation was valid); however, imprisonment failed as a method of identifying serious criminal misconduct when looking at short-term sentences. These sentences tended to be imposed for arbitrary reasons, such as location or homelessness, that were unrelated to the seriousness of the offence.

Justices William Gummow, Michael Kirby, and Susan Crennan decided the validity of the legislation by applying an "appropriate and adapted" test similar to the second limb of the Lange test respecting freedom of political communication. The arbitrary reasons for imposing, or not imposing, short terms of imprisonment mentioned by Gleeson were used to support this conclusion.

The Court published its orders on 30 August 2007, to ensure people could be enrolled to vote in the 2007 election, and published its reasons on 26 September 2007.

In other words, Roach had won the case and prisoners were allowed to vote in elections but only if they have a sentence below a certain amount of time. Even though Roach won the case she was still not able to vote due to the length of her sentence.

See also 

 Australian constitutional law

References

External links

 

High Court of Australia cases
Australian constitutional law
Rights in the Australian Constitution cases
2007 in Australian law
2007 in case law
Right of prisoners to vote